Jairo Anibal Cossio Zapata (born 3 July 1970, in Antioquia) is a retired male weightlifter from Colombia. He won a bronze medal for his native South American country at the 2003 Pan American Games.

References
Profile

1970 births
Living people
Colombian male weightlifters
Weightlifters at the 2003 Pan American Games
Sportspeople from Antioquia Department
Pan American Games bronze medalists for Colombia
Pan American Games medalists in weightlifting
Central American and Caribbean Games silver medalists for Colombia
Competitors at the 2006 Central American and Caribbean Games
Central American and Caribbean Games medalists in weightlifting
Medalists at the 2003 Pan American Games
20th-century Colombian people
21st-century Colombian people